The following elections were scheduled to occur in the year 2015.

Africa
 2015 Beninese parliamentary election 26 April 2015
 2015 Burkinabé general election 29 November 2015
 2015 Burundian legislative election 29 June 2015
 2015 Burundian presidential election 21 July 2015
 2015-16 Central African general election 30 December 2015 and 14 February 2016
 2015 Comorian legislative election 25 January and 22 February 2015
 2015 Ivorian presidential election 25 October 2015
 2015 Egyptian parliamentary election 2 December 2015
 2015 Ethiopian general election 24 May 2015
 2015 Lesotho general election 28 February 2015
 2015 Nigerian general election 28–29 March 2015
 2015 Sudanese general election 13–16 April 2015
 2015 Tanzanian constitutional referendum 30 April 2015
 2015 Tanzanian general election 25 October 2015
 2015 Tanzanian parliamentary election 25 October 2015
 2015 Togolese presidential election 25 April 2015
 2015 Zambian presidential election 20 January 2015

Asia
 2015 Azerbaijani parliamentary election 1 November 2015
 2015 Bihar Legislative Assembly election October–November 2015
 2015 Delhi Legislative Assembly election 7 February 2015
 2015 Indonesian local elections 9 December 2015
 2015 Kazakhstani presidential election 26 April 2015
 2015 Myanmar general election 8 November 2015
 2015 North Korean local elections 19 July 2015
 2015 Singaporean general election 11 September 2015
 2015 Sri Lankan presidential election 8 January 2015
 2015 Sri Lankan parliamentary election 17 August 2015
2015 Tajikistani parliamentary election 1 March 2015
June 2015 Turkish general election 7 June 2015
November 2015 Turkish general election 1 November 2015
2015 Uzbekistani presidential election 29 March 2015
2015 Hong Kong local elections 22 November 2015

Middle East
2015 Israeli legislative election 17 March 2015
2015 Saudi Arabian municipal elections 12 December 2015

Europe
 2015 Andorran parliamentary election 1 March 2015
 2015 Nagorno-Karabakh parliamentary election 3 May 2015
 2014–15 Croatian presidential election 28 December 2014 and 11 January 2015
 2015 Croatian parliamentary election 8 November 2015
 2015 Danish general election 18 June 2015
 2015 Faroese general election 1 September 2015
 2015 Estonian parliamentary election 1 March 2015
 2015 Finnish parliamentary election 19 April 2015
 2015 Åland legislative election 18 October 2015
 2015 French regional elections 6 and 13 December 2015
 2015 French departmental elections 22 and 29 March 2015
 2015 Hamburg state election 2 February 2015
 2015 Bremen state election 10 May 2015
 2015 Gibraltar general election 26 November 2015
January 2015 Greek legislative election 25 January 2015
2014–15 Greek presidential election 17, 23, and 29 December 2014 and 18 February 2015
September 2015 Greek legislative election 20 September 2015
2015 Italian presidential election 29–31 January 2015
2015 Dutch provincial elections 18 March 2015
2015 Norwegian local elections 14 September 2015
2015 Polish presidential election 10 and 24 May 2015
2015 Polish parliamentary election 25 October 2015
2015 Portuguese legislative election 4 October 2015
2015 Madeira regional election 29 March 2015
2015 Catalan parliamentary election 27 September 2015
2015 Spanish general election 20 December 2015
2015 Swiss federal election 18 October 2015
June 2015 Turkish general election 7 June 2015
November 2015 Turkish general election 1 November 2015
2015 Ukrainian local elections 25 October and 15 November 2015
2015 United Kingdom general election 7 May 2015

North America

Canada
 2015 Canadian federal election 19 October 2015

Mexico
 2015 Mexican legislative election 7 June 2015

United States
 2015 Philadelphia mayoral election 3 November 2015
 2015 Kentucky gubernatorial election 3 November 2015
 2015 Louisiana gubernatorial election 21 November 2015
 2015 Mississippi gubernatorial election 3 November 2015

Oceania

Australia
 2015 Queensland state election 31 January 2015
 2015 New South Wales state election 28 March 2015

Federated States of Micronesia
 2015 Micronesian parliamentary election 3 March 2015

Kiribati 
 2015-16 Kiribati parliamentary election 30 December 2015 and 7 January 2016

Tuvalu
 2015 Tuvaluan general election 31 March 2015

Caribbean
 2015-16 Haitian parliamentary election 9 August 2015, 25 October 2015, and 20 November 2016
 2015 Haitian presidential election 25 October 2015
 2015 Saint Kitts and Nevis general election 16 February 2015
 2015 Trinidad and Tobago general election 7 September 2015

Central America
2015 Belizean general election 4 November 2015
2015 Guatemalan general election 6 September and 25 October 2015

South America
 2015 Venezuelan parliamentary election 6 December 2015
 2015 Argentine general election 25 October and 22 November 2015
 2015 Guyanese general election 11 May 2015
 2015 Surinamese general election 25 May 2015
 2015 Uruguayan municipal elections 10 May 2015

See also
 Local electoral calendar 2015
 National electoral calendar 2015
 Supranational electoral calendar 2015

 
Elections
2015